Cubieboard is a single-board computer, made in Zhuhai, Guangdong, China. The first short run of prototype boards were sold internationally in September 2012, and the production version started to be sold in October 2012. It can run Android 4 ICS, Ubuntu 12.04 desktop, Fedora 19 ARM Remix desktop, Armbian, Arch Linux ARM, a Debian-based Cubian distribution, FreeBSD, or OpenBSD.

It uses the AllWinner A10 SoC, popular on cheap tablets, phones and media PCs. This SoC is used by developers of the lima driver, an open-source driver for the ARM Mali GPU. At the 2013 FOSDEM demo it ran ioquake 3 at 47 fps in 1024×600.

The Cubieboard team managed to run an Apache Hadoop computer cluster using the Lubuntu Linux distribution.

Technical specifications

Cubieboard1
The little motherboard utilizes the AllWinner A10 capabilities
 SoC: AllWinner A10
 CPU: Cortex-A8 @ 1 GHz CPU, 
 GPU Mali-400 MP
 video acceleration: CedarX able to decode 2160p video
 display controller: unknown, supports HDMI 1080p
 512 MiB (beta) or 1GiB (final) DDR3
 4 GB NAND flash built-in, 1x microSD slot, 1x SATA port.
 10/100 Ethernet connector
 2x USB Host, 1x USB OTG, 1x CIR.
 96 extend pin including I²C, SPI, LVDS
 Dimensions: 10 cm × 6 cm

Cubieboard2
The second version, sold since June 2013, enhances the board mainly by replacing the Allwinner A10 SoC with an Allwinner A20 which contains 2 ARM Cortex-A7 MPCore CPUs and a dual fragment shader Mali-400 GPU (Mali-400MP2).

This board is used by Fedora to test and develop the Allwinner SoC port of the distribution.

There is also a version available with two microSD card slots.

Cubietruck (Cubieboard3) 
The third version has a new and larger PCB layout and features the following hardware:
 SoC: Allwinner A20
 CPU: ARM Cortex-A7 @ 1 GHz dual-core
 GPU: Mali-400 MP2
 display controller: Mali-400 GPU, supports HDMI 1080p, no LVDS support
 2 GiB DDR3 @ 480 MHz
 8 GB NAND flash built-in, 1x microSD slot, 1x SATA 2.0 port (Hard Disk of 2,5").
 10/100/1000 RTL8211E Gigabit Ethernet
 2x USB Host, 1x USB OTG, 1x CIR.
 S/PDIF, headphone, VGA and HDMI audio out, mic and line-in via extended pins
 Wi-Fi and Bluetooth on board with PCB antenna (Broadcom BCM4329/BCM40181)
 54 extended pins including I²C, SPI
 Dimensions: 11 cm × 8 cm

There is no LVDS support any longer. The RTL8211E NIC allows transfer rates up to 630–638 Mbit/s (sending while 5–10% idle) and 850–860 Mbit/s (receiving while 0–2% idle) when simultaneous TCP connections are established (testing was done utilising iperf with three clients against Cubietruck running Lubuntu)

To connect a 3.5" HDD the necessary 12 V power can be delivered by a 3.5 inch HDD addon package which can be used to power the Cubietruck itself as well. Also new is the option to power the Cubietruck from LiPo batteries.

Cubieboard 4
On May 4, 2014 CubieTech announced the Cubieboard 4, the board is also known as CC-A80.
It is based on an Allwinner A80 SoC (quad Cortex-A15, quad Cortex-A7 big.LITTLE), thereby replacing the Mali GPU with a PowerVR GPU. The board was officially released on 10 March 2015.

 SoC: Allwinner A80
 CPU: 4x Cortex-A15 and 4x Cortex-A7 implementing ARM big.LITTLE
 GPU: PowerVR G6230 (Rogue)
 video acceleration: A new generation of display engine that supports H.265, 4K resolution codec and 3-screen simultaneous output
 display controller: unknown, supports: 
 microUSB 3.0 OTG

Cubietruck Plus (Cubieboard 5) 
The fifth version has the same PCB layout and almost the same features as the CubieTruck. 
 SoC: Allwinner H8
 CPU: ARM Cortex-A7 @ 2 GHz octa-core
 GPU: PowerVR SGX544 @ 700 MHz
 display controller: Toshiba TC358777XBG, supports HDMI 1.4 1080p and DisplayPort, no LVDS support
 2 GiB DDR3
 8 GB EMMC flash built-in, 1x microSD slot, 1x SATA 2.0 port (Hard Disk of 2,5") via USB bridge.
 10/100/1000M RJ45 Gigabit Ethernet
 2x USB Host, 1x USB OTG, 1x CIR.
 S/PDIF, headphone, and HDMI audio out, mic and line-in via 3.5mm jack, and onboard mic.
 Wi-Fi (dual-radio 2.4 and 5 GHz) and Bluetooth on board with PCB antenna
 70 extended pins including I²C, SPI
 Dimensions: 11 cm × 8 cm

See also

 List of open-source hardware projects

References

External links
 
 Cubieboard on Debian project wiki
 Cubieboard on Fedora Linux distribution wiki
 Cubieboard on ArchLinux ARM documentation
 Cubieboard2 on Void Linux distribution wiki
 Cubieboard on OpenSuse wiki
 Cubieboard on FreeBSD wiki
 NetBSD/evbarm on Allwinner Technology SoCs on NetBSD wiki

Single-board computers